The Arabian eagle-owl (Bubo milesi) is an owl of the southern Arabian peninsula.

References

 

Arabian eagle-owl
Arabian eagle-owl
Arabian eagle-owl